Katrin Neuenschwander (born 29 June 1971 in Konolfingen) is a retired Swiss alpine skier who competed in the 1992 Winter Olympics.

External links
 sports-reference.com
 

1971 births
Living people
Swiss female alpine skiers
Olympic alpine skiers of Switzerland
Alpine skiers at the 1992 Winter Olympics
Sportspeople from the canton of Bern